Megacraspedus cuencellus is a moth of the family Gelechiidae. It was described by Aristide Caradja in 1920. It is found in France and Spain.

The forewings are uniform mouse grey with the margin whitish from one-third to the apex. The hindwings are mouse grey.

References

Moths described in 1920
Megacraspedus